The IEEE Photovoltaic Specialists Conference (also called PVSC) is the longest running technical conference dedicated to photovoltaics, solar cells, and solar power. The first PVSC was in 1961 at the NASA headquarters in Washington DC. The number of conference areas have expanded and now include PV reliability and solar resource. The conference has also had many diverse and distinguished keynote speakers like Sarah Kurtz who won the conference's William Cherry Award in 2012. PVSC is also where the most notable breakthroughs in PV are often first announced, such as record Solar-cell efficiency, new technologies like TOPCon, heterojunction (HJT), and tandem cells, derivation of new algorithms, and discoveries of new phenomena such as Potential-induced degradation and light and enhanced temperature induced degradation (LeTID).

William R. Cherry Award
PVSC honors scientists and researchers who have made significant contributions to the field of photovoltaics since 1980. Significant recipients are Martin Green in 1990, Richard Swanson in 2002, Stuart Wenham in 2009, and Professor Harry Atwater in 2019.

Middle & High School Competition
For over 20 years, PVSC has inspired high school youth to engage with scientists, explore and present their concepts at the conference, and compete to win prizes. Starting in 2020, the competition was expanded to include middle schoolers, and the format was changed to encourage more creativity by asking students to write about how solar energy will change the future in the "Solar Future Naratives" competition and to pitch solar energy projects that could positively impact their communities in the "Solar Energy Video Pitch" competition.

Location History

Additional Reading
 www.pv-magazine.com/press-releases/keynote-speaker-selected-for-39th-ieee-photovoltaic-specialists-conference_100011234/
 www.pv-magazine.com/press-releases/call-for-papers-and-registration-open-for-39th-ieee-photovoltaic-specialists-conference_10009871/
 www.pv-magazine.com/press-releases/pvd-is-the-key-von-ardenne-presents-coating-solutions-for-heterojunction-topcon-and-tandem-cells-in-milan/
 https://solarindustrymag.com/ieee-photovoltaic-specialists-conference-calls-for-papers
 https://www.pv-tech.org/tracker-terrain-loss-the-elephant-in-the-room-and-the-low-hanging-fruit/

References

IEEE conferences
Photovoltaics
Solar cells
Solar energy